The Nègrepelisse massacre was a 1622 siege and massacre by troops of the young French king Louis XIII against the Protestant stronghold of Nègrepelisse in France. This siege followed the siege of Montauban, in which Louis XIII had failed against the Huguenot city.

The city was captured after a short siege, but all the inhabitants were massacred, without distinction of age or sex; practically all women were raped and the city was looted and burnt to the ground. This severe treatment was due to the false claim that a French Royal Army regiment left in garrison in the city by the Duke of Mayenne had been exterminated by the citizens. The king had ordered:

See also
 French Wars of Religion
 Huguenot rebellions

References

1622 in France
Conflicts in 1622
Negrepelisse, Siege of
History of Tarn-et-Garonne
Negrepelisse
Huguenot rebellions
Massacres committed by France